Greenwood Cemetery is a  cemetery in Rockford, Illinois. Founded in 1852, it is the largest and oldest in the city. The Greenwood Cemetery Chapel and Crematory was listed on the National Register of Historic Places.

History
In 1838, the first burial occurred in Rockford, Illinois, shortly after the settlement was founded. A man drowned in the Rock River and his body was buried on a plot which is now near the intersection of Cedar and Winnebago Streets. The daughter of Germanicus Kent was buried nearby, making it the first city burial ground. In the early 1840s, a new area was briefly used for burials on the south side of State Street. In 1844, the property was exchanged for two lots on the north bank of Kent's Creek. It was chartered the next year as the Rockford Cemetery Association. After another cemetery was chartered in 1853, the Rockford Cemetery Association's land became known as the West Side Cemetery.

In 1852, the Galena and Chicago Union Railroad connected to Rockford and needed to use the lands of the West Side Cemetery. The cemetery moved to the northeast corner of Main and Auburn Streets. It was officially incorporated on June 23, 1852. An additional  were purchased from D. C. Littlefield in 1879.

Chapel and crematory
In 1887, the cemetery decided to build a chapel to provide shelter for services during inclement weather. The chapel was designed by Henry Lord Gay in the Richardsonian Romanesque style. Its tower was meant to resember a Roman War Tower. A  onyx was installed, engraved with the named of those who died in combat. The chapel may have served as a war memorial until Memorial Hall was constructed downtown in 1903.

By the 1920s, cremation had gained popularity as an alternative to burial. Frank B. Gibson was commissioned to design a crematory addition for the chapel. The first cremation occurred on October 20, 1921. After the crematory opened, the cemetery board of trustees decided to change the name to Greenwood Cemetery. On August 28, 2012, the chapel and crematory was recognized by the National Park Service with a listing on the National Register of Historic Places.

Notable burials
 Ross Barnes, baseball player
 William Bebb, 19th Governor of Ohio
 James Henry Breasted, archaeologist
 John T. Buckbee, U.S. Representative
 Stan Campbell, football player
 Edward F. W. Ellis, member of California State Assembly
 Julia Lathrop, social reformer
 William Lathrop, U.S. Representative
 John Henry Manny, inventor
 Anna Peck Sill, educator 
 Loyd Wheaton, Medal of Honor recipient

References

External links
 Greenwood Cemetery and Chapel
 

Cemeteries in Illinois
National Register of Historic Places in Winnebago County, Illinois
1852 establishments in Illinois
Buildings and structures in Rockford, Illinois
Cemeteries on the National Register of Historic Places in Illinois
Geography of Rockford, Illinois
Cemeteries established in the 1850s